The letter is an 1884 painting by the Australian artist Frederick McCubbin. The painting depicts a young woman reading a letter walking in the bush alongside a stream.

The model for the woman was the artist's sister Harriet McCubbin (known as "Polly"), an art student. The setting is believed to have been worked up from en plein air sketches of the Yarra River near Darebin Creek.

A privately held  sister piece, featuring the woman reading the letter without the bush setting will be auctioned in November 2021.

The painting was acquired by the Art Gallery of Ballarat in 1946 and remains part of its collection.

References 

1884 paintings
Paintings by Frederick McCubbin
Paintings in Australia
Collections of the Art Gallery of Ballarat